The 2018–19 Florida Gulf Coast Eagles women's basketball team will represent Florida Gulf Coast University during the 2018–19 NCAA Division I women's basketball season. The Eagles, led by seventeenth year head coach Karl Smesko, will play their home games at the Alico Arena and were members of the Atlantic Sun Conference.  They finish the season 28–4, 16–0 in A-Sun play to win the Atlantic Sun regular season. Florida Gulf Coast won the conference tournament championship game over Liberty, 72–49. They lost in the first round to Miami (FL).

Media
All home games and conference road are shown on ESPN+ or A-Sun.TV. Road games are also broadcast on the FGCU Portal.

Roster

Schedule

|-
!colspan=12 style=| Non-conference regular season

|-
!colspan=12 style=| Atlantic Sun Conference regular season

|-
!colspan=12 style=| Atlantic Sun Tournament

|-
!colspan=9 style=| NCAA Women's Tournament

Source

Rankings
2018–19 NCAA Division I women's basketball rankings

Coaches did not release a Week 2 poll and AP does not release a final poll.

See also
 2018–19 Florida Gulf Coast Eagles men's basketball team

References

Florida Gulf Coast
Florida Gulf Coast Eagles women's basketball seasons
Florida Gulf Coast Eagles women's basketball
Florida Gulf Coast Eagles women's basketball
Florida Gulf